The divellion or dibellion was a symbol of the late Byzantine Empire, the Emperor's personal banner.  It was carried by the skouterios ("shield-bearer"), alongside the Imperial shield, on official events. Emperor Stefan Dušan of Serbia (r. 1331–55) also adopted the Imperial divellion, which was purple and had a golden cross in the center.

See also
Byzantine flags and insignia
Labarum

References

Sources

2nd millennium in the Byzantine Empire
Byzantine regalia
Serbian Empire
Historical flags